Raindo United Services is a proposed cargo airline based in Indonesia. Founded in June 2022, the airline received an initial investment of USD100 million. The airline plans to launch services by July 2023 on both domestic and international routes to neighboring cities using a fleet of Boeing 737 freighters.

References 

Cargo airlines of Indonesia